Gutta-percha Boy is a 1957 Soviet drama film adaptation of the novel by Russian writer Dmitry Grigorovich.

Plot 
The film is set in the end of the 19th  century.

Petya, is an eight-year orphan who has been given  into training  to the German acrobat Karl Becker, who with curses and beatings introduces his new assistant to the circus profession and ruthlessly exploits the child in his performances. The only consolation which brightens the harsh life  of the gutta-percha boy, as Petya is referred to on the posters, is the concern of the carpet clown Edwards, who pities the orphan and secretly teaches him the real art of the circus... During one of the performances, Petya while performing a difficult trick on Becker's demand, falls from a high altitude.

Cast
 Alexey Gribov as Clown Edwards
 Mikhail Nazvanov as Karl Bogdanovich Bekker
 Aleksandr Popov as Petya Subbotin (as Sasha Popov)
 Inna Fyodorova as Varvara Akimovna
 Olga Vikladt as Maria Pavlovna
 Ivan Koval-Samborsky as Circus Manager
 Andrei Popov as Count Sergey
 Marina Strizhenova as Countess
 Aleksandra Popova as Aunt Sonya
 Marina Gutkovich as Verochka

External links

1957 films
1957 drama films
Soviet drama films
Circus films
Mosfilm films
Films based on Russian novels